Arthur Austin (2 August 1873 – 1 February 1962) was a Guyanese cricketer. He played in four first-class matches for British Guiana in 1894/95 and 1895/96.

See also
 List of Guyanese representative cricketers

References

External links
 

1873 births
1962 deaths
Cricketers from British Guiana
Migrants from British Barbados to British Guiana
People from Saint George, Barbados